The Universidade Feevale (Feevale University) (Feevale) is a Brazilian university in the city of Novo Hamburgo (Vale do Rio dos Sinos, the largest shoe manufacturing center of the country) in the metropolitan region of Porto Alegre, Rio Grande do Sul. The selection process is through entrance exam and continuous assessment.

It is a community entity, non-profit, with didactic autonomy, scientific, administrative and disciplinary. Through the teaching of undergraduate, postgraduate, research and extension, Feevale educates citizens.

History

On June 28, 1969 was founded the Associação Pró-Ensino Superior em Novo Hamburgo (Aspeur), maintainer of Feevale under the name Federação de Estabelecimentos de Ensino Superior em Novo Hamburgo (Federation of Institutions of Higher Education in Novo Hamburgo).

On July 21, 1999, the Centro Universitário Feevale acquired university autonomy through the approval of the Minister of Education Paulo Renato Souza. Thereafter, the projects of the institution could be developed more rapidly, providing opportunities for the achievement of desired objectives.

A major achievement occurred on April 5, 2010, when Novo Hamburgo celebrated its 83 years of political emancipation, when it was published in the Diário oficial (Official Gazette), an ordinance of the Ministry of Education, accrediting the University Center as Universidade Feevale (Feevale University). The news was expected by the academic community and the municipality for at least five years.

Student life
Feevale has approximately 18 000 students in all levels of education, and 1450 teachers. It has two campuses: the Campus I is on Avenue Dr. Maurício Cardoso, 510, Hamburgo Velho neighborhood and Campus II in RS-239, 2755, Vila Nova neighborhood.

Education

Undergraduation
Offers 38 undergraduate courses:

Health Sciences
 Biomedical Sciences
 Biological Sciences
 Pharmacology 
 Technological Course in Gastronomy
 Technological Course in Hospital Management
 Physical Education
 Physical Education – major in Teaching
 Medicine
 Nursing
 Physiotherapy
 Nutrition
 Chiropractic

Pure and technological sciences

 Architecture and Urban Planning
 Computer Science
 Computer Science – major in Teaching
 Buildings’ Construction Technology
 Environmental Management Technology
 Internet Systems Technology
 Design
 Design – emphasis on Fashion and Technology
 Production Engineering
 Electronics Engineering
 Mechanical Engineering
 Chemistry Engineering
 Information Systems

Human Sciences
 Visual Arts
 Arts – Major in Teaching
 History
 Languages – major in English and Portuguese
 Education
 Psychology
 Special Program in Teaching Formation

Institute of Applied Social Sciences
 Business and Administration
 Accounting
 Journalism
 Advertising
 Public Relations
 Technological Course in International Business
 Technological Course in Finances
 Technological Course in Digital Games
 Technological Course in Human Resources
 Law
 Tourism

Award 

The Feevale received the National Award for Educational Management 2008, with the project "Geographic information system applied to the administration of the campuses I and II of the University Feevale. The institution was the only finalist from Rio Grande do Sul, competing alongside five other university in the country — two  from Santa Catarina and three from São Paulo. The National Confederation of Education Institutions and Humus Consultancy, responsible for the award, received 35 entries from schools all over Brazil, who presented their projects and successful cases in academic management, social responsibility, people, and financial-economic.

More information 

 1 Course Specific Higher Education - Production Management
 1 Special Program of Pedagogical Education of Teachers
 48 post-graduation lato sensu (specialization)
 3 post-graduate studies (Master)
 A course of post-graduate studies (PhD)
 25 scientific research groups, with 138 projects in execution
 Partnership with 54 institutions in 17 countries
 48 extension projects

See also
Brazil University Rankings
Universities and Higher Education in Brazil

References

External links 
 Official website (in Portuguese)
 English website

Educational institutions established in 1969
Novo Hamburgo
1969 establishments in Brazil
Universities and colleges in Rio Grande do Sul
Private universities and colleges in Brazil